The Missouri Valley Bridge & Iron Co., also known as Missouri Valley Bridge Company, was a engineering, construction, and steel fabrication firm that operated through the late nineteenth and most of the twentieth centuries. It was based in Leavenworth, Kansas, with a WWII facility in Evansville, Indiana.

History 
The company was formed in 1874 by Edwin Farnsworth and D. W. Eaves in Leavenworth, Kansas.  In 1888, it was acquired by Alonzo. J. Tullock, who had previously served as the engineer and manager of the firm.  Katherine S. Tullock, Alonzo's widow, served as the president from 1907 to 1921, an unusual development for the time in a male-dominated field.  Her son, Hubert S. Tullock became president of the firm in 1921. 

Throughout the early twentieth century, the firm supplied and built bridges across the country.  These projects included the Free Bridge and the McKinley Bridge, both across the Mississippi River.

National Register of Historic Places listed bridges
Many of the company's bridges are listed on the U.S. National Register of Historic Places.  They include:
19th Street Bridge, built 1888, 19th St., Denver, CO (Missouri Valley Bridge & Iron Co.), NRHP-listed
Cairo Mississippi River Bridge, built 1929, Cairo, Illinois to Bird's Point, Missouri (Missouri Valley Bridge & Iron Co.)
Chevelon Creek Bridge, Chevelon Creek, SE of Winslow, Winslow, AZ (Missouri Valley Bridge & Iron Co.), NRHP-listed
Cottonwood River Bridge, KS 177, N edge of Cottonwood Falls, Cottonwood Falls, KS (Missouri Valley Bridge & Iron Co.), NRHP-listed
Cottonwood River Pratt Truss Bridge, Main St., 0.8 mi. W of int with 1st St., Cedar Point, KS (Missouri Valley Bridge Co.), NRHP-listed
Crooked River Railroad Bridge (Oregon, 1911)
Delaware River Warren Truss Bridge, Coyote Rd., 190th St., 4.1 mi. S, 0.5 mi. E of Fairview, Fairview, KS (Missouri Valley Bridge & Iron Co.), NRHP-listed
East Fork Wolf Creek Pratt Truss Bridge, W 290th Dr., 0.8 mi. E of jct. with S. 50th Ave., 2.0 mi. S and 4.0 mi. E of Cheyenne, Delhi, KS (Missouri Valley Bridge Co.), NRHP-listed
Eleventh Street Arkansas River Bridge, US 66 over the Arkansas R., from Tulsa to W. Tulsa, Tulsa, OK (Missouri Valley Bridge & Iron Co.), NRHP-listed
Fish Creek Bridge, AZ 88, milepost 223.50, Tortilla Flat, AZ (Missouri Valley Bridge & Iron Co.), NRHP-listed
Hobbs Creek Truss Leg Bedstead Bridge, On Hobbs Creek Rd., 0.6 mi. W of jct with Solomon Rd., Gypsum, KS (Missouri Valley Bridge & Iron Co.), NRHP-listed
Labo Del Rio Bridge, Cty. Rd. F40 over Piedra River, Arboles, CO (Missouri Valley Bridge Company), NRHP-listed
Lakewood Park Bridge, One Lakewood Dr., 0.01 mi. N of jct. with Iron Ave., Salina, KS (Missouri Valley Bridge & Iron Works), NRHP-listed
Lewis and Clark Bridge, Over the Missouri R., MT 13, Wolf Point, MT (Missouri Valley Bridge and Iron Co.), NRHP-listed
Ninth Street Bridge, E of new 9th Street bridge, over Boise R., Boise, ID (Missouri Valley Bridge & Iron Co.), NRHP-listed
Nodaway River Bridge, Pedestrian path in Pilot Grove County Park, Grant, IA (Missouri Valley Bridge and Iron Co.), NRHP-listed
South Canon Bridge, Cty. Rd. 134, Glenwood Springs, CO (Missouri Valley Bridge & Iron Co.), NRHP-listed
State Bridge, Off CO 131, State Bridge, CO (Missouri Valley Bridge Company), NRHP-listed
State Highway 3 Bridge at the Nueces River, US 90, 13 mi. E of jct. with Kinney Cnty., Uvalde, TX (Missouri Valley Bridge & Iron Co.), NRHP-listed
Waco Suspension Bridge, over Brazos River, Waco, TX (1914 rehabilitation by Missouri Valley Bridge & Iron Co.), NRHP-listed

Other projects
The Oregon Trunk Rail Bridge, a non−NRHP-listed one, was erected by the company across the Columbia River in Oregon and Washington. It is an approximately  railroad bridge across the river, built in 1911 and opened in January 1912. The steel superstructure was manufactured by the Pennsylvania Steel Company, and erected by MVB&I company.

Shipyards

During World War II the MVB&I company opened two shipyards, at Evansville, Indiana and at Leavenworth, Kansas. 171 LSTs (Landing Ship, Tank), 64  Landing craft tank and three YSD-11 Class Seaplane Wrecking Derrick were built during the war at Evansville, before the yard closed in 1945.  The company ranked 98th among United States corporations in the value of World War II military production contracts.

The Leavenworth yard built a wide range of smaller naval and military vessels, continuing in business after the war, producing mainly towboats and barges until 1982.

References

Bridge companies
Shipyards of the United States
Leavenworth, Kansas
Evansville, Indiana
Manufacturing companies based in Kansas
United States home front during World War II
Defunct shipbuilding companies of the United States
Industrial buildings and structures in Indiana
Construction and civil engineering companies of the United States
1874 establishments in Indiana
Construction and civil engineering companies established in 1874
American companies established in 1874